Marcos Barreto Luis (born 25 April 1960) is a Mexican long-distance runner. He competed in the men's 5000 metres at the 1988 Summer Olympics.

References

1960 births
Living people
Athletes (track and field) at the 1987 Pan American Games
Athletes (track and field) at the 1988 Summer Olympics
Mexican male long-distance runners
Olympic athletes of Mexico
Place of birth missing (living people)
Central American and Caribbean Games medalists in athletics
Pan American Games competitors for Mexico
20th-century Mexican people